Tonight's Decision is the fourth full-length album by Katatonia, released in 1999 by Peaceville Records. It was reissued in 2003 with two bonus tracks.

Background 
Around this time, the band were being influenced less by metal and more by alternative, with Renkse citing Jeff Buckley, whose song "Nightmares by the Sea" was covered on this album, as well as Radiohead as examples.

Renske's close friend, Mikael Åkerfeldt of Opeth, was present to help record, produce and work on ideas for vocal tracks.

Track listing 

The standard edition and 2003 reissue each end with a different song, but on every version the final track ends with 25 to 30 seconds of silence and a hidden track, hence there are actually two official versions of "Black Session".

Personnel

Katatonia 
 Jonas Renkse – vocals
 Anders Nyström – guitars, keyboards, backing vocals
 Fredrik Norrman – bass
 Dan Swanö – session drums

Additional personnel 
 Mikael Åkerfeldt – additional vocal production
 Travis Smith – artwork, design, layout
 Paul Loasby – management
 Mia Lorentzson – mastering
 Joakim Petterson – engineering
 Tomas Skogsberg – engineering
 Camilla Af Geijerstam – photography
 Martin Bencik – desert photography assistant
 Brad Gilson Jr. – photography

References 

Katatonia albums
1999 albums
Albums with cover art by Travis Smith (artist)

Alternative rock albums